"I Have a Dream" is a song by Swedish pop group ABBA. It was released in December 1979 as the sixth and final single from the group's sixth studio album, Voulez-Vous. Anni-Frid Lyngstad sang lead vocals. It was a major hit, topping the charts in many countries and peaking at No. 2 in the UK over the Christmas week of 1979. Twenty years later, Irish pop group Westlife released a version that reached No. 1 in the UK over the Christmas week of 1999.

Overview
The song was written by Benny Andersson and Björn Ulvaeus circa March 1979 and was taken from the group's 1979 album, Voulez-Vous. Anni-Frid Lyngstad sang the lead vocals. It was released as a single in December 1979 with a live version of "Take a Chance on Me" as the B-side. The recording includes a final chorus by the children's choir from Stockholm International School. In the UK, "I Have a Dream" was held off the No. 1 spot by Pink Floyd's "Another Brick in the Wall", which also features a children's choir. "I Have a Dream" is included on the ABBA Gold: Greatest Hits album as well as in the Mamma Mia! musical.

In the UK, the single was issued in a lavish gatefold sleeve, intended as a souvenir for UK fans who had attended the Wembley concerts (the live recording of "Take a Chance on Me" being from one of them). The inner gatefold made use of the pyramid/mountain/iceberg designs similar to those used in the inner sleeve of Greatest Hits Vol. 2. The inner gatefold was effectively an advert for ABBA's existing albums released in the UK, but the back cover featured a message from ABBA themselves regarding the Wembley concerts, together with their signatures. The front cover used the same live photo of ABBA as the worldwide release, but artwork and fonts were different. This was only Epic's second picture sleeve for an ABBA single.

As of September 2021, it is ABBA's 12th-biggest song in the UK, including both pure sales and digital streams.

The live version of "Take a Chance on Me" on the B-side was one of three mixes of the same recording to be issued. Released soon after the concerts, this version is thought to be the genuine recording. A very slightly extended version, featuring spoken introductions from the group, was used as the B-side in Australia. This extended version has been released internationally on the deluxe edition of ABBA: The Album. Finally, a third mix was included on ABBA Live issued in 1986.

Charts

Weekly charts

Year-end charts

Certifications and sales

Cristy Lane version

American country and Christian artist Cristy Lane notably covered "I Have a Dream" in 1980. Lane had several years of commercial success in the country music market with songs like "Let Me Down Easy", "Penny Arcade" and "Simple Little Words". In 1980, she recorded the religious-themed "One Day at a Time", which became a number one hit and brought Lane to the attention of Christian music listeners. With a similar theme, Lane recorded "I Have a Dream" in October 1980, shortly after the success of "One Day at a Time". The track was cut at LSI Studios and was produced by Jerry Gillespie, with assistance from executive producer Don Grierson. In the same recording session, the songs "Rio Grande" and "You Make It Easy" were also cut.

Lane's cover was released as a single in December 1980 via Liberty Records and LS Records. It was backed by the B-side, "Rio Grande", and was released as a 7" vinyl record. "I Have a Dream" spent multiple weeks on the Billboard Hot Country Songs chart between December 1980 and early 1981 before peaking at number 17. It was Lane's final top 20 hit single on the chart in her music career. It also became her second single to chart in New Zealand, where it reached number 34 in 1981. The song was later released on her 1981 studio album of the same name. The album included the original single's B-side as well. Lane's cover received a positive review from Billboard magazine in their December 1980 issue. Reviewers described the track as having "a rich south of the border undercurrent" while praising its production, calling it "crystalline."

Track listing
7" vinyl single
 "I Have a Dream" – 3:52
 "Rio Grande" – 3:05

Charts

Westlife version

Irish boy band Westlife released a cover of "I Have a Dream" in December 1999, twenty years after ABBA's original release. The song became the group's fourth UK number-one single. The release was a double A-side with "Seasons in the Sun" in UK and Ireland and "Flying Without Wings" in the Netherlands, and a triple A-side in Australia with both "Seasons in the Sun" and "Flying Without Wings" included. The release became the UK's Christmas number-one single of 1999, beating Cliff Richard's charity single "The Millennium Prayer" into the No. 2 spot. Westlife's remix version of "I Have a Dream" was later included on their second studio album Coast to Coast in 2000. It then extended its peak into January 2000 and spending 17 weeks on the UK chart. The song was the 26th best-selling single of 1999 in the UK and it was also the final number one single of the 1990s.

In 2001, as part of a UNICEF fund-raising campaign, the song was re-recorded with additional vocals by Indonesian child singer, Sinna Sherina Munaf. The song has received a Platinum sales certification in the UK for over 707,000 copies (as of 30 November 2021) sold across physical, digital, and streaming equivalent sales. It is the band's second-best-selling single for both paid-for and combined sales.

Music video
The music video for the Westlife version of "I Have a Dream" features the band exiting out of a car and into a dark street where a group of children are. The children start singing with the band members and play with toys lying nearby before the band head back to the car and drive away.

As of 2019, the video has reached 34 million views on YouTube.

Track listings
 United Kingdom. Ireland
 "I Have a Dream" (Single Remix) – 4:06
 "Seasons in the Sun" (Single Remix) – 4:10
 "On the Wings of Love" – 3:22

 Australia
 "Flying Without Wings" - 3:35
 "I Have a Dream" (Remix) - 4:06
 "Seasons in the Sun" (Single Remix) - 4:10
 "Flying Without Wings" (Video) - 3:40

 Netherlands
 "Flying Without Wings" - 3:35
 "I Have a Dream" (Remix) - 4:06

Charts

Weekly charts

Year-end charts

Certifications and sales

Other cover versions

In 1983, Greek singer Nana Mouskouri recorded a French cover of this song entitled "Chanter La Vie" for her album Quand on revient. She also recorded an English version, which was released as a single in 1986 and included on her 1990 album Alone,as well as a German version of the song, "Ich leb´im Traum" - "I live in a dream".
 In 1985, Croatian singer Tereza Kesovija recorded a cover of the song entitled "Pronađi put" with lyrics in Croatian by Željko Sabol for her album of the same name
In 1987, a recording by the dansband Streaplers, with lyrics in Swedish by Ingela Forsman, "Jag har en dröm", was Number 1 on the Swedish Svensktoppen radio chart for 17 weeks from 31 May – 6 December of that year.
In 1994, Hawaiian singers the Makaha Sons covered this song on their album Ke Alaulau
Swiss chef/singer Dan Daniell recorded a cover as a duet with original ABBA member Anni-Frid Lyngstad for his album Lieber Gott
In 2004, Irish singer Daniel O'Donnell covered the song for his double album Songs of Inspiration/I Believe
In 2005, Irish folk music duo Foster & Allen have covered the song for their album Sing The Number 1's
In 2005, a duet version was recorded by German celebrity Barbara Schöneberger and American singer Sydney Youngblood for the German ABBA Mania compilation, which coincided with a TV special
In 2006, Italian-American singer Al Martino included a cover of the song for his album Come Share The Wine
In 2006, German AC/DC tribute band Riff Raff recorded a cover in AC/DC style for their album Rock 'N' Roll Mutation Vol. 1: Riff Raff Performs ABBA
In 2007, Connie Talbot covered the song on Over The Rainbow
In 2008, the song was covered in a jazz/lounge music style by American group BNB on the album Bossa Mia: Songs of ABBA
The song is featured in the Mamma Mia! musical as a recurring musical theme sung by the character of Sophie. At the beginning of the musical, the context of the song is interpreted that Sophie dreams about her real father coming to the wedding when she sends the invitations, to her potential fathers, away. At the end, Sophie sings this song when she and Sky set off the Island to go around the world. The context of the song is used in this case as Sophie, now knowing what she really wants, hopes to achieve her dream as she goes around the world with Sky. The two contexts are also differentiated by distinct production, the first being an orchestral segment, and the second having a Greek-influenced folk instrumentation. 
It is featured in the trailers for both the film adaptation as well as its sequel. The song, covered by actress Amanda Seyfried in the movie, is also included on the first film's soundtrack. It is also featured in the 2018 sequel, Mamma Mia! Here We Go Again, performed by Lily James.
A version by Hannah John-Kamen features prominently in episode 2, season 1 of the British TV show Black Mirror entitled "Fifteen Million Merits".

References

1979 songs
1979 singles
1980 singles
1999 singles
ABBA songs
Bertelsmann Music Group singles
Christmas number-one singles in the United Kingdom
Cristy Lane songs
Dutch Top 40 number-one singles
European Hot 100 Singles number-one singles
Irish Singles Chart number-one singles
Liberty Records singles
LS Records singles
Number-one singles in Scotland
Number-one singles in Switzerland
Polar Music singles
Protest songs
RCA Records singles
Songs about dreams
Songs written by Benny Andersson and Björn Ulvaeus
Streaplers songs
UK Singles Chart number-one singles
Westlife songs